Föritz is a village and a former municipality on the small Föritz river, which flows into the Steinach) in the Sonneberg district of Thuringia, Germany. It was merged into the new municipality Föritztal together with Judenbach and Neuhaus-Schierschnitz on 6 July 2018.

References

External links
 Föritz on the Föritztal website (German)

Former municipalities in Thuringia
Sonneberg (district)
Duchy of Saxe-Meiningen